Hell to Pay may refer to:

Music

Albums 
Hell to Pay (The Jeff Healey Band album), 1990
Hell to Pay (Dokken album), 2004

Songs 
"Hell to Pay", by The Almighty from the album Soul Destruction, 1991
"Hell to Pay", by Deep Purple from the album Now What?!, 2013
"Hell to Pay", by Five Finger Death Punch from the album Got Your Six, 2015
"Hell to Pay", by Drowning Pool from the album Hellelujah, 2016

Literature  
Hell to Pay (Giangreco book), a 2009 book about World War II by Dennis Giangreco
Hell to Pay: The Unfolding Story of Hillary Rodham Clinton, a 2001 biography by Barbara Olson
Hell to Pay (novel), a 2002 crime novel by George Pelecanos
Hell to Pay, a play by Amy Freed

Film  
Hell to Pay (2005 film), by Roberto Gomez Martin
Hell to Pay (2011 film), by Jay Jennings
Suicide Squad: Hell to Pay, a 2018 animated film